Shanghai is an unincorporated community in King and Queen County, Virginia, United States.

The Upper Church, Stratton Major Parish was listed on the National Register of Historic Places in 1973.

References

Unincorporated communities in Virginia
Unincorporated communities in King and Queen County, Virginia